Fathabad (also Romanized as Fatḩābād) is a village in Baghestan Rural District, in the Eslamiyeh District of Ferdows County, South Khorasan Province, Iran. At the 2006 census, its population was 438, in 185 families.

References 

Populated places in Ferdows County